Branch of Lilac is a 2007 Russian musical drama film directed by Pavel Lungin.

Plot 
The film tells about the great Russian composer Sergey Rachmaninov, who, according to legend, after each performance received a bouquet of white lilac from an unknown woman. He performs grueling concerts abroad. The wife cannot stand it and leaves him. And suddenly he unravels the mystery of the white lilac.

Cast 
 Yevgeny Tsyganov as Sergei
 Liya Akhedzhakova as Anna Sergeevna
 Oleg Andreyev as Shalyapin
 Igor Chernevich as Doctor Dahl
 Evdokiya Germanova as Aunt Satina
 Viktoriya Isakova as Anna
 Aleksey Kortnev as Steinway
 Aleksey Petrenko as Zverev
 Miriam Sekhon as Marianna
 Viktoriya Tolstoganova as Natalya
 Evgeniy Tsyganov as Sergei
 Maksim Zausalin as Third journalist

References

External links 
 

2007 films
2000s Russian-language films
Russian musical drama films
2000s musical drama films